The Bajaur casket, also called the Indravarma reliquary, year 63, or sometimes referred to as the Avaca inscription, is an ancient reliquary from the area of Bajaur in ancient Gandhara, in the present-day Federally Administered Tribal Areas of Pakistan. It is dated to around 5–6 CE. It proves the involvement of the Scythian kings of the Apraca, in particular King Indravarman, in Buddhism. The casket is made of schist.

The inscription which is written in Kharoshthi:

The inscription was highly useful in clarifying the little-known Apraca dynasty.

Notes

References
Baums, Stefan. 2012. “Catalog and Revised Texts and Translations of Gandharan Reliquary Inscriptions.” In: David Jongeward, Elizabeth Errington, Richard Salomon and Stefan Baums, Gandharan Buddhist Reliquaries, pp. 207–208, Seattle: Early Buddhist Manuscripts Project (Gandharan Studies, Volume 1).
Baums, Stefan, and Andrew Glass. 2002– . Catalog of Gāndhārī Texts, no. CKI 242

See also
 Cetiya
 Bimaran reliquary
 Kanishka reliquary
 Rukhuna reliquary
 Apracharajas
 Bajaur

Archaeology in Pakistan